Ashley Riley (born April 27, 1995) is a male sprinter from Nassau, Bahamas, who mainly competes in the 400m. He attended CR Walker High School in Nassau, Bahamas, before going on to compete for Colby Community College and
Southeastern Louisiana University. 

Riley won a silver medal at the 2016 IAAF World Indoor Championships in Portland, Oregon, by running the third leg in the first heat on the 4 x 400 Relay.   He also competed in the 4 x 400 Relay at the 2016 NACAC U23 Championships in Athletics in San Salvador, El Salvador.

Personal bests

References

External links
 World Athletics
 Southern Louisiana

1995 births
Living people
Bahamian male sprinters
People from Nassau, Bahamas
Southeastern Louisiana University alumni
World Athletics Indoor Championships medalists
Junior college men's track and field athletes in the United States